State Route 35 (SR 35) is a north–south state highway in East Tennessee. Most of the route is a secret, or hidden designation, as it runs concurrently with U.S. Highways in the area.

Route description

Blount County

SR 35, alone, begins in Blount County at an interchange with US 129 (Alcoa Highway/SR 115) in Alcoa. SR 35 goes southeast as a 4-lane divided highway known as S Hall Road, where it passes through some residential areas before entering a major business district, where it downgrades to an undivided 4-lane, before crossing a bridge into downtown Maryville. It immediately becomes N Washington Street before coming to an intersection with US 411 and SR 33 (E/W Broadway Avenue), where SR 35 becomes unsigned as it becomes concurrent with US 411. They continue east through downtown before having an intersection with SR 447 and turning north onto High Street, where it downgrades to a 2-lane as it leaves downtown. US 411/SR 35 continue northeast through residential areas before leaving Maryville as Sevierville Road and passing through farmland and rural areas to cross the Brabson Ford Bridge over the Little River and pass through Wildwood before crossing into Sevier County.

Sevier County

US 411/SR 35 enter Seymour, where they pass through a couple of neighborhoods before coming to an intersection with US 441 (Chapman Highway/SR 71) and SR 338 (Boyds Creek Highway), where US 411/SR 35 turn right to begin a wrong-way concurrency with US 441/SR 71. Chapman Highway (US 411/US 441/SR 35/SR 71) goes east as a 4-lane undivided highway to pass through a major business district before leaving Seymour and entering mountains. The highway becomes narrow and curvy, through it does keep 2 travel lanes in each direction, for several miles before widening to a divided highway. US 411/SR 35 pass through downtown as Main Street, where they have an intersection with SR 448 (North Parkway) and Parkway, before continuing east through a business district as Dolly Parton Parkway. They then have an intersection with SR 449 (Veterans Boulevard) before leaving Sevierville and passing through Cherokee Hills, where they become Newport Highway and have intersections with SR 416 (Pittman Center Road) and SR 339 (Long Springs Road). US 411/SR 35 narrows to 2-lanes and passes through farmland and rural areas before crossing into Jefferson County.

Jefferson County

US 411/SR 35 becomes narrow and winding as it passes through rural areas before passing through Chestnut Hill, where it has an intersection with SR 92. The highway then turns northeast and winds its way through mountains for several miles before widening to a 4-lane divided highway. They continue northeast through rural areas for several miles before crossing into Cocke County.

Cocke County

US 411/SR 35 pass through a rural area of Newport before coming to an intersection with US 25W/US 70 (Highway 25/SR 9), where US 411 ends and SR 35 becomes concurrent with that highway. They then have an interchange with I-40 (Exit 432 A/B) before passing through a residential and district as a 4-lane undivided highway. US 25W/US 70/SR 9/SR 35 then come to an intersection with US 25E/SR 32, where US 25W and US 25E merge to form US 25 and SR 32 joins the concurrency. The route becomes W Broadway Street as it passes more businesses before coming to an intersection with US 321 (Cosby Highway), where SR 32 turns south along US 321 while SR 35 turns north along US 321. US 321/SR 35 then narrow to 2-lanes as they piggyback through downtown along E Main Street, McMahan Avenue, a bridge over the Pigeon River, and North Street. They then pass through residential areas before leaving Newport and crossing a bridge over the French Broad River. US 321/SR 35 have an intersection with SR 160 before widening to a 4-lane divided highway to pass through Parrottsville, where it has an intersection with SR 340. They continue northeast through farmland and rural areas before crossing into Greene County.

Greene County

US 321/SR 35 narrow to 2-lanes and pass through rural areas to cross a bridge over the Nolichucky River. They continue northeast through the farmland of Greene County for several miles before having an intersection with SR 349 (Warrensburg Road) and entering Greeneville. They pass through a residential area before coming to an intersection with SR 70/SR 107 (Asheville Highway), where US 321/SR 35 become concurrent with SR 107 as they enter a business district as W Main Street. They then enter downtown as S Main Street, where they have concurrencies with SR 350 (E McKee Street/W Summer Street) and US 11E Business (W Summer Street/Tusculum Boulevard), with SR 107 turning east onto US 11E Business (Tusculum Boulevard). US 321/SR 35 leave downtown as N Main Street and continue north through residential areas to have an intersection with SR 172 (Baileyton Road) before SR 35 comes to an end at an intersection with US 11E (Andrew Johnson Highway/SR 34) and SR 93 (Kingsport Highway), with US 321 turning right to continue along US 11E/SR 34.

Major intersections

See also

References
Official Tennessee Highway Maps

035
035
035
035
035